William Carl Burger (born 1932) is an American botanist known for his contributions to the Costa Rican flora.  Burger described 104 plant species, primarily in the Lauraceae and Moraceae.

Burger received a B.A. from Columbia University in 1953, an M.Sc. from Cornell University in 1958 and a Ph.D. from Washington University in St. Louis in 1961.  He served as Chair of the Botany Department at the Field Museum.

References

1932 births
Living people
21st-century American botanists
Columbia College (New York) alumni
Cornell University College of Agriculture and Life Sciences alumni
Washington University in St. Louis alumni
People associated with the Field Museum of Natural History